Cheilonycha is a genus of beetles in the family Cicindelidae, containing the following species:

 Cheilonycha auripennis Lucas, 1857
 Cheilonycha chalybea (Dejean, 1825)

References

Cicindelidae